Devdi Iqbal ud-Dowla is a mansion and heritage structure located in Hyderabad, India. It was the devdi of nobleman Sir Viqar ul Umra (also known as Iqbal ud-Dowla). It was built in the late 18th century. The historic structure is neglected by authorities and is on the verge of destruction.

History 
It was built in the late 18th century.

Architecture 
The building is an example of Palladian and Edwardian styles of architecture. The palace consisted of four quadrangles with a cistern in the middle.

References 

Buildings and structures in Hyderabad, India
Palaces of Paigah of Hyderabad